Binghamia may refer to:
 Binghamia (butterfly), a genus of skippers in the family Hesperiidae
 Cupido (butterfly) (syn. Binghamia), a genus of butterfly in the family Lycaenidae
 Espostoa (syn. Binghamia), a genus of columnar cacti